Amarna Letter EA8 is a continuation of correspondence between Napḫurureya, king of Egypt, and Burra-Buriyaš the king of Karaduniyaš.  

Within the Moran edition, the letter is translated by Ebeling.

The letter is written in the language Akkadian, and dates to a period circa 1349 to 1334 B.C.,  The letter is part of a series of correspondences from Babylonia to Egypt, which run from EA2 to EA4 and EA6 to EA14. EA1 and EA5 are from Egypt to Babylonia. 

The inscription reads:

See also
Amarna letters: EA 1, EA 2, EA 3, EA 4, EA 5, EA 6, EA 7, EA 9, EA 10, EA 11

References

Amarna letters